AVIATR (Aerial Vehicle for In situ and Airborne Titan Reconnaissance) was a proposed airplane mission concept to Titan, a moon of Saturn. The concept was developed in 2011 by a team of scientists led by Jason W. Barnes at the University of Idaho. Compared to Earth, Titan has about one-seventh the gravity but four times the atmospheric density. These conditions make it easier to fly there.

Summary
The Aerial Vehicle for In-situ and Airborne Titan Reconnaissance (AVIATR) is a proposed unmanned plane (or drone) which if approved, will take high-definition images of the surface of Saturn's moon Titan to help scientists understand the moon's geology. It is planned that at the end of the mission, the unmanned plane will attempt a landing on Titan's dunes.

Overview
The design called for a  airplane powered by an advanced Stirling radioisotope generator that would have allowed it to fly uninterrupted for about one year. However, the National Research Council's "Decadal Survey" did not prioritize the moon Titan for exploration, and the development of the advanced Stirling radioisotope generator was suspended indefinitely.

See also
Nuclear power in space
Dragonfly (spacecraft) (NF4 finalist)

References

External links
AVIATR proposal presentation

Missions to Saturn
Titan (moon)
Proposed space probes
Extraterrestrial aircraft
Advanced Stirling radioisotope generator
Unmanned aerial vehicles of the United States